The 2014 Kilkenny Intermediate Hurling Championship was the 50th staging of the Kilkenny Intermediate Hurling Championship since its establishment by the Kilkenny County Board in 1929. The championship began on 13 September 2014 and ended on 9 November 2014.

On 9 November 2014, Mullinavat won the championship after a 0–17 to 0–14 victory over St. Patrick's Ballyragget in the final at Nowlan Park. It was their fourth title overall and their first title since 2006.

Tullogher-Rosbercon's Cian O'Donoghue was the championship's top scorer with 3-22.

Results

First round

Relegation play-off

Quarter-finals

Semi-finals

Final

Championship statistics

Top scorers

Overall

In a single game

References

Kilkenny Intermediate Hurling Championship
Kilkenny Intermediate Hurling Championship